New York Proposition 1 was a 2017 ballot measure that would have established a constitutional convention to revise the Constitution of the State of New York, subject to the approval of the voters. Section 2 of Article XIX of the state constitution requires that every 20 years the ballot question "Shall there be a convention to revise the constitution and amend the same?" should be submitted to the voters. The referendum was rejected by a large margin on November 7, 2017.
A "yes" vote supported holding a constitutional convention to develop and propose changes to the state constitution that voters would vote on at the election on November 5, 2019.
A "no" vote opposed holding a constitutional convention to develop and propose changes to the state constitution that voters would vote on at the election on November 5, 2019.
A blank or invalid vote was not counted either way.

Election process
The ballot question is the first step in the process of calling a constitutional convention in New York. If a majority of voters cast their ballots in favor of holding a convention, voters would elect 204 convention delegates on November 6, 2018. Fifteen of the delegates would be elected statewide. Three would be elected from each of the state's 63 senate districts. The convention would convene on April 2, 2019, in Albany. Delegates would be allowed to draft a new constitution or amendments to the existing constitution. Referring a constitution or amendment to the ballot would require a simple majority vote of the delegates. The people of New York would vote on the convention-proposed changes to the constitution on November 5, 2019.

The ballot question is as follows:

Supporters
There were three political action committees, the Committee for a Constitutional Convention, NY People's Convention PAC, and Restrict & Regulate in NY State 2019, registered in support of the constitutional convention question. The committees reported $389,474 in contributions and $361,039 in expenditures.

The top contributor in support of the question was Democratic fundraiser Bill Samuels, who contributed $100,725 in cash and $61,772 in in-kind services. Compared to the opposition, the supporters of the proposition were disorganized and underfunded.

Notable supporters 

 Bill Samuels, businessman
 Evan Davis, former president of the New York City Bar Association
Brian Kolb, Minority Leader of the New York State Assembly
Richard Brodsky, former member of the New York State Assembly
Carl Paladino, 2010 gubernatorial candidate and former Buffalo Public Schools Board of Education member; initially supported, then opposed, then announced support on day before election

Opponents

There were two committees, New Yorkers Against Corruption and Say No to a Constitutional Convention (SNCC), registered in opposition to the constitutional convention question. The committees reported $635,300 in contributions and $311,810 in expenditures in the last filing period before the election; an additional $1,000,000 was raised and $2,200,000 spent in the period between then and Election Day, which was not publicly reported until a month after the election.

The top contributor in opposition to the question was the New York State United Teachers, who donated $444,000, all after the last filing period. SEIU 1199 came in second with a $250,000 donation. On the whole, the opponents of the proposition grossly outspent the supporters and, with labor union backing, rallied public employees to their cause, giving the no vote a massive base in even conservative small towns where government is often the largest and most lucrative employer. This led to consistent and widespread no votes throughout the state and across all demographics.

Criticism of the opposition
The opposition coalition was criticized for spreading false rumors and misinformation about the convention, namely a rumor that blank votes would be counted as yes, another stating that a convention could take away public employees' pensions (which is prohibited under the U.S. Constitution), a grossly inflated estimate of the cost (New Yorkers Against Corruption claimed a price tag in the hundreds of millions, when most realistic estimates placed the cost at $50,000,000), and implying that Albany insiders had orchestrated the convention vote (it has been a scheduled part of the state Constitution since the 19th century, and almost all notable political forces in the state in fact opposed the convention) and would control and corrupt the delegate selection process (delegates are elected, and fewer than 10% of the delegates to the most recent convention in 1967 were incumbent Albany politicians).

Notable opponents 

 Bill de Blasio, Mayor of New York City
 Andrew Cuomo, Governor of New York. Initially implied support, then stated he would vote against the referendum the day before it was scheduled
 John Flanagan, Majority Leader of the New York State Senate
 Carl Heastie, Speaker of the New York State Assembly
 Jeff Klein, New York State Senator and Leader of the Independent Democratic Conference
 Edward Cox, Chairman of the New York State Republican Committee
 John DeFrancisco, New York State Senator and Deputy Majority Leader

Polling

Results

References

2017 New York (state) elections
2017 ballot measures
New York (state) propositions
Constitutional convention ballot measures in the United States